Bugsy and Mugsy is a 1957 Warner Bros. Looney Tunes cartoon directed by Friz Freleng. 
The short was released on August 31, 1957, and stars Bugs Bunny, with Rocky and Mugsy. Bugs discovers that two robbers are hiding out on the floor above him, and plays them off against each other.

Plot 
On a stormy, wet night, Bugs decides to 'move to drier quarters' (as shown by a sign in his house) before his house gets slowly flooded. The drier quarters that he decides to move into is a condemned building nearby. Staying inside a hole, he is pleasantly surprised by the building.

However, after complimenting the place, police sirens begin to go off, as Rocky and Mugsy escape from the cops and run quickly up to the exact floor that Bugs is staying at. The two criminals look out of the window to see if the police had gone; They had. In Rocky's words, they both 'gave them the slip'. Mugsy congratulates the boss for being smart. He then turns on the radio, by Rocky's command. The station that they listen to had breaking news, explaining that Rocky and Mugsy had both committed an unknown robbery. Before hearing where they were last seen, Rocky tells Mugsy to turn off the radio.

Both of the criminals look at the priceless jewelry stolen in the briefcase. Before Mugsy can touch the '14-karat', saying that they got 'some haul', Rocky agrees but gently hits Mugsy's hand with a gun.

After hearing the word 'karat', Bugs assumes that there is carrots somewhere in the building, so emerges from the hole. Bugs hears Rocky telling Mugsy that they should both 'get some shudeye', getting ready to pull yet another robbery the next day. Bugs talks briefly to the audience saying that somebody should teach them that crime doesn't pay; That someone is him.

As both of them fall asleep, Bugs puts a telephone beside Rocky's ear. As Bugs begins talking to Rocky, his cigarette flips up. Bugs explains to Rocky that he trusted Mugsy with the briefcase, ending by saying "Don't make me laugh." Rocky opens his eyes, and looks around but shrugs his shoulders and goes back to sleep. Bugs, once again, tells Rocky that Mugsy is getting ideas to keep the briefcase for himself. Now wide awake, Rocky slaps Mugsy a few times, teaching Mugsy to 'get good ideas'. Mugsy is confused.

After going back to sleep, Bugs then gives Mugsy, still asleep, an axe before going back into the hole. Bugs once again tells Rocky, also asleep, on a telephone that "they don't call Mugsy the 'Detroit Butcher' for nothing." and suggests that Mugsy could kill Rocky any minute so he can take all the jewellery. Once again waking up, Rocky is shocked to see Mugsy sleeping with an axe in his hand. Mugsy is barely close to Rocky chopping his head in half, as he wakes just before Rocky can do it. Rocky only chopped a part of the couch Mugsy was sleeping on. Rocky then explains that Mugsy's devious scheme didn't work. Mugsy's hat then falls in half, revealing his yellow hair. Mugsy soon describes Rocky as 'a million laughs', and chuckles.

Both Rocky and Mugsy try to go asleep again (with Mugsy worrying sick that Rocky is going to get him again) but Bugs, above the floor, unscrews the bolts on a huge light, where Rocky is sleeping underneath it. However, before accomplishing another trick, Mugsy wakes up and sees the rabbit unscrewing the light. He grabs a ladder and attempts to screw them back in. Unfortunately for him, the light fell before he could screw in a single bolt. Rocky commands Mugsy to go down and kicks him multiple times in the backside.

Bugs checks if Rocky is asleep (which he is) and replaces his cigarette with a stick of dynamite and tip-toes over to Mugsy. In a Rocky-ish voice, Bugs tells Mugsy to "give me a light". Mugsy, being relieved that Rocky isn't mad at him, lights the dynamite. It explodes and Mugsy is sad that Rocky's mad at him again. Rocky punches and kicks Mugsy, ties him up and throws him out of the room, into the hallway. Rocky then shouts at him to go to sleep and hits Mugsy on the head with a baseball bat.

Bugs saws a circle around Rocky's chair, but he soon wakes up and realises what is currently happening. He and the chair both fall down and smash into un-coming things. Emerging from the hole, Rocky shoots his gun, believing that somebody is there. Bugs opens a floorboard to the corrider and gives Mugsy the saw. Rocky opens the door and is fuming when he sees Mugsy with the saw in his hand. He then says "I don't know how ya's done it but I KNOW YA'S DONE IT!!" and smacks Mugsy, leavin' cracks in the walls. 

After Rocky re-enters the room, Bugs, this time, ties Mugsy on a pair of roller-skates, as Rocky points his gun outside the door. Underneath, Bugs uses a magnet to control Mugsy's movement on the ground. Mugsy runs into the door, with roller-skates on, as Rocky is stunned. Mugsy shrugs his shoulders, as Rocky tells him to take them off. Unfortunately for him, Mugsy ramages into Rocky and smacks into the wall. Rocky punches Mugsy across the room but Mugsy, once again, smacks Rocky into the wall. This continues happening until the police hear the commotion in the condemned building and surround the place.

Rocky and Mugsy are then both taken away by the cops. As Mugsy tries to say what had happened, Rocky punches him and kicks him on the ground. Bugs, sitting on the steps of the building, reading a "Do It Yourself" book, says "Isn't it wonderful what you can do with some wire and a few electric bulbs?" as we see a large electric sign that point to 'Rocky's Hideaway' as the cartoon fades out.

Music
 Brahms' Lullaby by Johannes Brahms
 Jimmy Valentine by Gus Edwards

References

External links

 

1957 films
1957 animated films
1957 short films
1950s Warner Bros. animated short films
Looney Tunes shorts
Short films directed by Friz Freleng
Films set in abandoned houses
Films scored by Milt Franklyn
Films scored by Carl Stalling
Bugs Bunny films
Films produced by Edward Selzer
1950s English-language films
Rocky and Mugsy films